Yaşar Halit Çevik, (born 1955 in Gölcük, Kocaeli, Turkey) is a Turkish ambassador.

Private life and education
He finished in 1978 his studies at the department of international relationships at the Ankara Üniversitesi Siyasal Bilgiler Fakültesi (Ankara University School of Political Science). He speaks English. He is married and has two children.

Working life
He worked at the embassy of Khartum in 1981 and became the consul of Turkey in Stuttgart in 1983. In 1989, he became consul at the consulate general of Turkey in Athens. After several diplomatic assignments, he was the consul general in Zurich between 1995-1997 and the ambassador to Syria between 2004 and 2009. In 2009, he became the undersecretary for bilateral political affairs. From 2012 to October 2016, he is the Permanent Representative of Turkey to the United Nations. Since 2019 he heads the OSCE Special Monitoring Mission to the eastern Ukraine as a chief monitor.

References 

1955 births
Living people
21st-century Turkish diplomats
Permanent Representatives of Turkey to the United Nations
Ambassadors of Turkey to Syria